The Natal Field Force (NFF) was a multi-battalion field force originally formed by Major-General Sir George Pomeroy Colley in Natal for the First Boer War. It was later re-established for the Second Boer War (1899–1902) and commanded by Major-General Sir Redvers Buller VC GCB GCMG (although after the failed attack at Colenso he was replaced as overall commander in South Africa by Lord Roberts).

First Boer War

The First Boer War broke out in December 1880 with the Boer Commando's in the Transvaal besieging British garrisons there. The Governor of Natal Sir George Pomeroy Colley raised the Natal Field Force which took part in the actions at Laing's Nek, Schuinshoogte and Majuba Hill.

It was composed of:

5 Companies of the 58th Regiment of Foot
5 Companies of the 3rd Battalion, 60th Rifles
About 150 Cavalry
A party of Royal Navy sailors
4 guns of the Royal Artillery

After Schuinshoogte the NFF was reinforced by 6 companies of the 92nd (Gordon) Highlanders and two squadrons of the 15th (The King's) Hussars.

Second Boer War

At the outbreak of the Second Boer War General Sir George White was appointed Governor in Chief of Natal, superseding General Sir Penn Symons. Symons had already split his forces chiefly into two garrisons at Ladysmith and Dundee.

Ladysmith garrison
 1st Battalion Devonshire Regiment
 1st Battalion Liverpool Regiment and Mounted infantry company
 19th Royal Hussars (Detachment)
 5th Royal Irish Lancers
 Brigade division, Royal Artillery
 10th Mountain Battery, Royal Garrison Artillery
 23rd Company, Royal Engineers
 26th British field hospital
 Colonial troops

Dundee garrison
 1st Battalion Leicestershire Regiment and Mounted infantry company
 1st Battalion King's Royal Rifle Corps and Mounted infantry company
 2nd Battalion Royal Irish Fusiliers and Mounted infantry company
 18th Royal Hussars
 Brigade division, Royal Artillery

Other garrisons
At Pietermaritzburg:
 1st Battalion Manchester Regiment
 2nd Battalion King's Royal Rifle Corps
At Escourt:
 Natal Naval Volunteers
 Natal Royal Rifles
At Colenso:
 Durban Light Infantry

After the battles at Talana Hill and Elandslaagte General White recalled the Dundee garrison and concentrated his forces in defence of Ladysmith.

The Relief of Ladysmith

During the Second Boer War relief operation of the besieged town of Ladysmith, the NFF comprised:

Cleary's Division
General Cornelius Francis Clery's (2nd & 3rd) Division although temporarily commanded by Lyttelton for a time due to illness. The 3rd division was General Gatacre's command but most was diverted to Natal leaving him with only two and a half Battalions.

2nd Infantry Brigade commanded by General Sir Henry Hildyard
 2nd Battalion, Devonshire Regiment
 2nd Battalion, West Surrey Regiment
 2nd Battalion, West Yorkshire Regiment
 2nd Battalion, East Surrey Regiment

4th Infantry Brigade initially commanded by General The Hon. Neville Lyttelton and later by Colonel Charles Norcott.
 2nd Battalion, Cameronians (Scottish Rifles)
 3rd Battalion, King's Royal Rifle Corps
 1st Battalion, Durham Light Infantry
 1st Battalion, Rifle Brigade

5th Infantry Brigade commanded by General Arthur Fitzroy Hart
1st Battalion, Royal Inniskilling Fusiliers
1st Battalion, Connaught Rangers
2nd Battalion, Royal Dublin Fusiliers
1st Battalion, Border Regiment

6th Infantry Brigade commanded by General Geoffrey Barton
2nd Battalion, Royal Fusiliers
2nd Battalion, Royal Scots Fusiliers
1st Battalion, Royal Welch Fusiliers
2nd Battalion, Royal Irish Fusiliers

Cavalry Division
The (ad hoc) Cavalry Division commanded by Colonel Douglas Cochrane, 12th Earl of Dundonald
1st The Royal Dragoons
13th Hussars
14th Hussars (2 squadrons) arrived after the battle of Spion Kop
Bethune's Mounted Infantry
Thorneycroft's Mounted Infantry (4 companies)
South African Light Horse (4 squadrons)
The Composite Mounted Irregulars:
 5th Squadron Natal Carbineers
 Imperial Light Horse
 Detachment Natal police
 One Mounted Infantry Company

Artillery
Artillery commanded by Lieutenant-colonel Charles James Long, RA

1st Brigade Royal Artillery commanded by Lieutenant-colonel Henry Vaughan Hunt, RA
7th Field Battery
14th Field Battery
66th Field Battery
One Naval Twelve Pounder Battery (10 x 12-pounders)

2nd Brigade Royal Artillery commanded by Lieutenant-colonel Lawrence Worthington Parsons, RA
63rd Field Battery
64th Field Battery

Naval Artillery Brigade commanded by Captain Edward Pitcairn Jones, RN
One Heavy Battery 2 x 4.7" guns
One Section, Twelve Pounder Battery (2 x 12-pounders)

Misc unit's that joined after the battle of Spion Kop
A Mountain Battery
A Battery Royal Horse Artillery
2x Great Fortress Guns.

Warren's Division
General Sir Charles Warren's (5th) Division (later succeeded by Hildyard) joined up with the main body of the force shortly after the Battle of Colenso.

11th Infantry Brigade initially commanded by General Edward Woodgate but he was wounded at Spion Kop and died shortly afterwards. He was succeeded by General Arthur Wynne who was later wounded at the Battle of the Tugela Heights and succeeded by Colonel Walter Kitchener.
2nd Battalion Kings Own Royal Lancaster's
2nd Battalion Lancashire Fusiliers
1st Battalion South Lancashire Regiment
1st Battalion York and Lancaster Regiment

10th Infantry Brigade commanded by General John Talbot Coke.
Imperial Light Infantry
2nd Battalion Dorset Regiment
2nd Battalion Middlesex Regiment
2nd Battalion Somerset Light Infantry
(Yorkshire's and Warwickshire's being left at Cape Colony

Support troops
Royal Engineers commanded by Lieutenant-colonel George Hamilton Sim (may not have been present)
17th Field Company
"A" Pontoon Troop

References

Sources
Natal Army, www.legionwargames.com

Military history of South Africa
Military units and formations of the Second Boer War
19th-century history of the British Army